The women's team épée competition at the 2002 Asian Games in Busan, South Korea was held on 4 October 2002 at the Gangseo Gymnasium.

Schedule
All times are Korea Standard Time (UTC+09:00)

Results

Final standing

References
2002 Asian Games Report, Page 413

External links
 Official website

Women Epee